Shakti is a 2012 action Kannada film directed by Anil Kumar starring Malashri, Hema Choudhary  and P. Ravi Shankar. This is Ramu Enterprises 32nd film produced by Ramu. The film released across Karnataka on 6 January 2012.

Cast
 Malashri as Shakti/ Chamundi
 Hema Choudhary as Rudramma
 Sayaji Shinde as Bacchegowda 
 P. Ravi Shankar as Huchchegowda
 Ashish Vidyarthi as Police Officer
 Sharath Lohitashwa as Bettappa
 Avinash
 Sadhu Kokila as Thrill Deena 
 Vinaya Prasad
 Kiran Srinivas as Vijay
 Radhika Gandhi as Gayathri 
 Ashalatha
 Kuri Prathap
 H. M. T. Nandha 
 Shashikala
 Ne.La.Narendra Babu 
 Suresh Mangalore 
 Mimicry Gopi 
 Shankar Bhat 
 Soujanya DV
 Mamatha Ravuth 
 Ashwath Narayan 
 Stunt Siddu 
 Fayaz Khan 
 Suryanarayana waali
 Lakshman Rao

Production
The film production went on floors in July 2011. This marks actress Malashri's 8th film with her husband's home banner. Malashri plays tough cop fighting against corruption. Anil Kumar, who was introduced as a script writer makes his debut at the direction and also scripts the screenplay along with dialogues. The film is expected to release in the first week of January 2012. One of the highlights of the film is the association of 5 stunt directors namely Thriller Manju, Ravi Varma, Ram Lakshman, Palani Raj and Mass Mada.

Soundtrack

K. Kalyan has written lyrics for the lone song composed by Vardhan in this film. The song "Bandiyu Saguthide" is sung by veteran actor Shivarajkumar. Akash Audio holds the audio recording rights. Vardhan composed the film's soundtrack for the album consisting of three tracks. The track "Bandi Saaguthide" was sung by actor Shiva Rajkumar, with lyrics penned by K. Kalyan.

Reception

Critical response 

A critic from The New Indian Express wrote "Cinematographers Sudhakar and Rajesh have done a neat job behind the camera. Their contribution in picturising the action sequences is immense". BSS from Deccan Herald wrote "Hardcore Malashree fans will be heartened to see their “Gundina Hudugi” revelling in what she does best. Ditto anger management ‘experts’. But there is little else to appreciate". A critic from News18 India wrote "An experienced director would have been able to make 'Shakti' work at least in B and C Centres. 'Shakti' has absolutely nothing to offer to movie lovers". A critic from Bangalore Mirror wrote  "Too much of a good thing is boring. There is no relief with the dialogues either. Maybe the debutant filmmaker thinks the audience is not intelligent enough to understand the progression of a story without dialogues".

Awards

References

2012 films
2010s Kannada-language films
Indian action films
2012 masala films
2012 directorial debut films
2012 action films